Grouplove is the first EP by Grouplove.

The EP was positively received, with the BBC calling it "a nugget of golden pleasure, petite, but perfectly proportioned". Drowned in Sound gave it a 7/10 rating, describing it as "a more than passable introduction to America's latest underground discoveries".

Track listing 
Source:

References 

2010 EPs
Grouplove albums